The 2019 British Superbike Championship season was the 32nd British Superbike Championship season.

Teams and riders

All entries used Pirelli tyres.

Race calendar and results

Championship standings

Riders' championship
Scoring system
Points are awarded to the top fifteen finishers. A rider has to finish the race to earn points.

References

External links

British Superbike Championship
Superbike Championship
British Superbike Championship